Imogen Hassall (25 August 1942 – 16 November 1980) was an English actress who appeared in 33 films during the 1960s and 1970s.

Early life 
Named after Shakespeare's Cymbeline heroine, she was born in Woking, Surrey, to a financially comfortable family of artists and businessmen. Her grandfather, John Hassall, and her aunt, Joan Hassall, worked as illustrators, while her father, Christopher Hassall, was a poet, dramatist and lyricist. She had a brother, Nicholas. Her godfather is said to have been the composer Ivor Novello, with whom her father had worked extensively as lyricist; conversely, on occasion Hassall would proudly claim that this distinction was Sir William Walton's with whom her father had collaborated in the early 1950s, denied by Lady Walton.

Career 
Hassall boarded and attended Elmhurst Ballet School, Camberley 1952–1954 and the Royal Ballet School, White Lodge, Richmond Park 1955–1958. Later in 1958 (aged 16) she studied in New York City, then returned to live with family in the Vale of Health by Hampstead Heath, London. She continued her absorption of the theatre mode with study at the London Academy of Music and Dramatic Art 1960–1962, following which she joined the company of the Royal Shakespeare Company for one season.  After enjoying an appearance in the William Douglas-Home comedy "The Reluctant Peer" at the Duchess Theatre in 1964, she appeared in British TV adventure series of the 1960s such as The Saint, The Avengers and The Persuaders! In her first significant film role, she played Tara in The Long Duel (1967). She gained further public notice as a dominant cave-girl in When Dinosaurs Ruled the Earth (1970) and played major roles in Carry On Loving and the cult horror film Incense for the Damned the same year. In 1973, she appeared in White Cargo alongside David Jason.

Personal life 
Hassall was married to actor Kenneth Ives, and before they were married, they had a daughter called Melanie Ives Hassall, who died four days after being born in 1972. She was briefly married to actor Andrew Knox (the son of actors Alexander Knox and Doris Nolan, who later committed suicide in 1987), but they separated after a few months of marriage, and she lost the baby she was expecting.

Hassall's private life was a regular subject of interest in tabloid newspapers. She was known for playing sexy, scantily clad characters in film and on TV. This, and the revealing outfits she wore at film premieres, resulted in her being referred to as the "Countess of Cleavage".

Death 
After her failed relationships, the death of her child, her miscarriage, and her career decline, she became depressed. Following previous suicide attempts, she was found dead in her Wimbledon home on the morning of 16 November 1980, when she failed to meet a friend, the actress Suzanna Leigh, with whom she was due to go on holiday to Mombasa that day. She had apparently committed suicide by overdosing on Tuinal tablets. She was interred in Gap Road Cemetery, Wimbledon, London.

Portrayal on stage and TV 

Her appearance in the film Carry On Loving (1970) led many years later to her being portrayed as a character in the play Cleo, Camping, Emmanuelle and Dick written by Terry Johnson. The play was produced at the Royal National Theatre in September 1998 and received the Olivier Award 1999 for Best New Comedy. Hassall was played by Gina Bellman. Johnson later adapted the play for a 2000 television film Cor, Blimey!, although the character of Hassall does not appear in the television version, which was much changed by Johnson from his original play.

Filmography

Film 

 The Bulldog Breed (1960) - Girl in Cinema (uncredited)
 The Cracksman (1963) – Guv'nor 's Secretary
 The Mind Benders (1963) – Girl Student
 The Early Bird (1965) – Sir Roger's Secretary
 Press for Time (1966) – Suffragette (uncredited)
 The Long Duel (1967) – Tara
 Bedtime (1967) - The Woman (Short film, banned by the BBFC, limited London release)
 Take a Girl Like You (1969) – Samantha
 Incense for the Damned (1970) – Chriseis
 Mumsy, Nanny, Sonny and Girly (1970) – Girlfriend
 El Condor (1970) – Dolores
 The Virgin and the Gypsy (1970) – The Gypsy's Wife
 Toomorrow (1970) – Amy
 When Dinosaurs Ruled the Earth (1970) – Ayak
 Carry On Loving (1970) – Jenny Grubb
 White Cargo (1973) – Stella
 Licensed to Love and Kill (1979) – Miss Martin (final film role)

Television 

 The Sentimental Agent (1 episode, 1963) – Nikki
 The Dickie Henderson Show (1 episode, 1963)
 It Happened Like This (1 episode, 1963) – Miss Jeryl
 Moonstrike (2 episodes, 1963) 
 The Scales Of Justice (1 episode, 1964) – Yvonne Purvis
 The Reluctant Peer (1 episode, 1964) 
 The Saint (3 episodes, 1964–1968) – Malia / Nadya / Sophia Arnetas
 No Hiding Place (1 episode, 1965) – Jane Bowden
 The Lance Percival Show - (1 episode, 1965)
 A Touch of Don Juan (1 episode, 1966)
 Theatre 625 (1 episode, 1967) – Madame Kanyl
 The Avengers (1 episode, 1967) – Anjali
 The Wednesday Play (2 episodes, 1967–1968) – Yasmina / Rogation (voice)
 Champion House (1 episode, 1967) – Christina
 Play of the Month (1 episode, 1967) – Ata
 Mickey Dunne (1 episode, 1967) - Veronica Cole
 The Troubleshooters (1 episode, 1967) – Nancy Clucas
 The Champions (1 episode, 1968) – Cleo
 Call My Bluff (1 episode, 1969) - Herself
 Softly, Softly (1 episode, 1970) – Molly Carson
 The Simon Dee Show (1 episode, 1970) - Herself
 Dear Mother...Love Albert (1 episode, 1970) - Girl (uncredited)
 The Persuaders! (1 episode, 1971) – Maria Lorenzo
 On The House (1 episode, 1971) – Thelma
 Celluloid Love (The Hassalls) - (TV Documentary 1971) - Herself
 Jason King (1 episode, 1972) – Gina
 ...And Mother Makes Three (1 episode, 1972) – Virginia
 Going for a Song (1 episode, 1972) - Herself
 Images (1 episode, 1972) - One-off special
 The Movie Quiz (2 episodes, 1972-3) - Herself

References

Bibliography 
 Biography: 
 Obituary:

External links 
 
 Imogen Hassall at HorrorStars

1942 births
1980 deaths
People from Woking
Alumni of the London Academy of Music and Dramatic Art
English film actresses
English television actresses
Drug-related suicides in England
Barbiturates-related deaths
20th-century English actresses
British comedy actresses
1980 suicides